Renee M. Johnson is an American scientist specializing in the mental health of adolescents and young adults. She researches substance abuse, substance use epidemiology, and violence in marginalized youth including persons of color, LGBTQ, and immigrants. Johnson is an associate professor in the Johns Hopkins Bloomberg School of Public Health.

Education 
Renee M. Johnson completed a B.A. at Spelman College in 1996. She earned a M.P.H. (1998) and a Ph.D. (2004) in the department of health behavior and health education at the UNC Gillings School of Global Public Health. Her dissertation was titled, Psychosocial Factors Associated with Women's Behavioral Intentions to Store Firearms Safely: An Application of the Theory of Planned Behavior.

Johnson was also a Yerby Fellow at the Harvard T.H. Chan School of Public Health from 2004-2006.

Career 
Johnson was an assistant professor at the Boston University School of Public Health from 2009 to 2013. She was also a visiting scientist at the Harvard Injury Control Research Center (2009-2014) and an investigator at the Harvard Youth Violence Prevention Center. Johnson is currently an associate professor in the department of mental health with a joint appointment in epidemiology at the Johns Hopkins Bloomberg School of Public Health, and a visiting scholar at the Colorado School of Public Health.

Johnson researches adolescent health and substance abuse and violence in marginalized groups including persons of color, LGBT youth, and immigrants.

In June 2020, Johns Hopkins University was awarded nearly $1M by the PhD Professional Development Innovation Initiative. Monies from the aware will be used to support  programs in professional development for PhD students. A portion  will be used to fund a four-part event series, on which Johnson collaborated, that provides "current and future doctoral students who are interested in the field of public mental and behavioral health with the range of potential non-academic career pathways".

Honors and awards 

 Johns Hopkins Bloomberg School of Public Health, Outstanding Teaching Faculty Award for “The Epidemiology of Substance Use and Related Problems” (2019)
 Johns Hopkins SOURCE Service-Learning Fellow (2019–20)
 Delta Omega Honorary Society in Public Health, Theta Chapter (2005)

Selected works

References

External links 

 

Living people
Place of birth missing (living people)
20th-century births
21st-century American women scientists
African-American women academics
American women academics
African-American academics
American medical researchers
Women medical researchers
Spelman College alumni
UNC Gillings School of Global Public Health alumni
Boston University faculty
Johns Hopkins Bloomberg School of Public Health faculty
Mental health researchers
Public health researchers
Year of birth missing (living people)
21st-century African-American scientists